ESPN Radio College Gameday is a day-long talk radio show on ESPN Radio covering the day's college football games. It is heard every Saturday during the season from noon until 7 p.m. ET. Some programs originate from the ESPN studios in Bristol, Connecticut; others are on location from game sites, just like College GameDay on television. The show, which began in 2000, is hosted by Matt Schick and analysts Brad Edwards and Trevor Matich, former NFL player. The show is produced by Steve Coughlin. Students and fans are welcomed and encouraged to stop by and watch the games on several high-definition monitors, and possibly take home T-shirts or mini-footballs which are being distributed to the crowd. Beginning in 2006, the show offered a new segment in which a fan conducts inspections of tailgate sites near the broadcast location. This segment airs only when the show is on the road.

Personalities

Current
Matt Schick: (host, 2018–present)
Brad Edwards: (analyst, 2010–present)
Trevor Matich: (analyst, 2007–present)

Former
Chris Fowler: (host, 2000–2004)
Kirk Herbstreit: (analyst, 2000–2004)
Todd McShay: (analyst, 2005–2009)
Dave Revsine: (host, 2005–2006)
Gerry DiNardo: (analyst, 2005–2006)
Scott Reiss: (host, 2007)
Ryen Russillo: (host, 2008–2014)
Doug Kezirian: (host, 2015–2017)

See also
College GameDay (football)

References

External links
ESPN Show page
ESPN Radio

American sports radio programs
College GameDay Radio Tour
College football on the radio